is a multimedia project created by Sega that utilizes Vocaloid voice synthesizers in order to create traditional 5-7-5 tanka and haiku poems. It consists of an iPhone app titled , released on July 26, 2013, as well as a PlayStation Vita game titled , released on January 23, 2014, and is described as a combination of a rhythm game and a word building game. A 4-episode comedy slice of life anime television series adaptation titled Go! Go! 575 aired between January 9 and January 30, 2014.

Characters

Reception
Famitsu gave the game an overall rating of 29/40.  
PlayStation LifeStyle's review praised the main characters, songs, and core gameplay, awarding it a 7/10.

References

External links
 

2014 Japanese television series endings
2014 video games
2010s animated comedy television series
C2C (studio)
Comedy anime and manga
Creative works using vocaloids
IOS software
Japanese comedy television series
Japan-exclusive video games
Lay-duce
Music video games
PlayStation Vita games
PlayStation Vita-only games
Sega video games
Slice of life anime and manga
Tokyo MX original programming
Video games set in Kanagawa Prefecture
Video games developed in Japan